Palpita bonjongalis is a moth in the family Crambidae. It is found in Cameroon, the Republic of Congo, the Democratic Republic of Congo (East Kasai, Bas Congo, Kinshasa, North Kivu, Katanga, Orientale) and South Africa.

References

Moths described in 1880
Palpita
Moths of Africa